Ene Rämmeld (born 12 January 1947, Tallinn) is an Estonian actress who lives in France.

In 1960s she worked at Ugala Theatre. Besides theatrical roles she has also played on several films.

In 1980s she moved to France.

She was married with to film director Vladimir-Georg Karassev-Orgusaar.

Filmography

 1968 Libahunt (role: Tiina)
 1971 Lindpriid (role: Illi)
 1973 Rasked aastad (role: Illi)
 1990 See kadunud tee (role: Salme)
 2007 Kuhu põgenevad hinged (role: Dora )

References

Living people
1947 births
Estonian film actresses
Estonian stage actresses
Estonian television actresses
20th-century Estonian actresses
21st-century Estonian actresses
Estonian emigrants to France
Estonian expatriates in France
Actresses from Tallinn